"Diamonds & Rust" is a song written, composed, and performed by Joan Baez. It was written in November 1974 and released in 1975.

In the song, Baez recounts an out-of-the-blue phone call from an old lover, which sends her a decade back in time, to a "crummy" hotel in Greenwich Village in about 1964 or 1965. She recalls giving him a pair of cufflinks, and surmises that memories bring "diamonds and rust". Baez has stated that the lyrics refer to her relationship with Bob Dylan.

The song was a top 40 hit on the U.S. pop singles chart for Baez, and is regarded by a number of critics and fans as one of her best compositions. It served as the title song on her gold-selling album Diamonds & Rust, which was released in 1975.

Bob Dylan

The song alludes to Baez's relationship with Bob Dylan ten years previously. Although Dylan is not specifically named in the song, in the third chapter of her memoir, And a Voice to Sing With (1987), Baez uses phrases from the song in describing her relationship with Dylan, and has been explicit that he was the inspiration for the song. She recounts how she originally told Dylan that the song was about her ex-husband David Harris, which was obviously not true. The lyrics, for example, include the lines, "Well, you burst on the scene already a legend / the unwashed phenomenon, the original vagabond...", which would describe Dylan but not Harris.

In her memoir, And a Voice to Sing With, Baez recounts a 1975 conversation between herself and Dylan, discussing songs to include in the then-upcoming Rolling Thunder Revue concerts:
"You gonna sing that song about robin's eggs and diamonds?" Bob had asked me on the first day of rehearsals.

"Which one?"

"You know, that one about blue eyes and diamonds..."

"Oh", I said, "you must mean 'Diamonds and Rust,' the song I wrote for my husband, David. I wrote it while he was in prison."

"For your husband?" Bob said.

"Yeah. Who did you think it was about?" I stonewalled.

"Oh, hey, what the fuck do I know?"

"Never mind. Yeah, I'll sing it, if you like."
But Baez's marriage to Harris had, in fact, already ended by the time the song was written and composed. In an interview with music writer Mike Ragogna, Baez later admitted that the character in the song is Dylan:
MR: "Diamonds and Rust" was another magic moment. You've said when you began writing the song, it started as something else until Dylan phoned you. Then it became about him. That must have been one helluva call.

JB: He read me the entire lyrics to "Lily, Rosemary and the Jack of Hearts" that he'd just finished from a phone booth in the Midwest.

MR: What was the song about originally?

JB: I don't remember what I'd been writing about, but it had nothing to do with what it ended up as.

Dylan's reaction
Dylan included a scene of Baez performing the song live on the Rolling Thunder Revue in his 1978 film Renaldo and Clara. In the 2009 American Masters documentary Joan Baez: How Sweet the Sound, Dylan praised the song in an on-camera interview: "I love that song 'Diamonds & Rust'. I mean, to be included in something that Joan had written, whew, I mean, to this day it still impresses me".

Variations
For her 1995 live recording Ring Them Bells, Baez performed the song as a duet with Mary Chapin Carpenter. In that performance, she changed the end lines: "And if you're / offering me diamonds and rust / I've already paid" to: "And if you ... well I'll take the diamonds." The line "I bought you some cufflinks, you brought me something" was changed to "I bought you some cufflinks, you brought troubles." And on February 25, 2009, in Austin, she sang it, "And if you ... well I'll take the Grammy." In 2010, she recorded it as a duet with Judy Collins on Collins's album Paradise. In 2018, during her Fare Thee Well Tour, she changed the line "Ten years ago / I bought you some cufflinks" to "Fifty years ago / I bought you some cufflinks".

Charts

Popular covers

Judas Priest recorded a cover of "Diamonds & Rust", with some of the verses omitted, on their album Sin After Sin. It was originally recorded a year earlier for Sad Wings of Destiny, but not included on that album. This early recording appears on the compilations The Best of Judas Priest and Hero, Hero, and some remasters of their first album Rocka Rolla. A live version of the song appears on the album Unleashed in the East. The concert DVD Rising in the East includes an acoustic performance that is closer to Baez's original version. The song remains a staple of Judas Priest live concert performances. 
Baez commented on the Judas Priest version:

Cover versions also have been recorded by Justin Vivian Bond, Blackmore's Night, S.O.D., Great White, Taylor Mitchell, Sarah Chen and Thunderstone.

The song has been sampled in two popular hip-hop songs, "Happiness" by Busdriver and "Upgrade Call" by Andre Nickatina. The versions used in both songs are pitch-warped to sound squeaky.

In live performance
Baez has performed the song no fewer than 234 times in concert. Even after the conclusion of her "Farewell Tour", Baez performed the song as a duet with Lana Del Rey when she showed up as a surprise guest at a Del Rey concert in Berkeley, California on October 6, 2019.

References

External links
Joan Baez performing the song in 1975

1975 singles
Songs about Bob Dylan
Joan Baez songs
Judas Priest songs
Songs written by Joan Baez
1974 songs
Song recordings produced by David Kershenbaum